The Inspector General Act of 1978 is a United 
States federal law that created Inspectors General for federal agencies and provides broad authorities for overseeing programs, promoting efficiencies, and detecting fraud, waste, and mismanagement throughout the federal government.

The 2010 Intelligence Authorization Act formally established the Office of the Inspector General of the United States Intelligence Community within the Office of the Director of National Intelligence.

In accordance with Title 50 U.S.C.A. § 3033, the Intelligence Community Inspector General (ICIG) conducts independent and objective audits, investigations, inspections, and reviews to promote economy, efficiency, effectiveness, and integration across the Intelligence Community.

On May 10, 2021, President Joe Biden nominated Thomas Monheim, the Acting Inspector General, to serve as the inspector general. On September 30, 2021, Monheim was confirmed by the US Senate

List of Inspectors General
Charles McCullough October 7, 2010 – March 2017 
Michael Atkinson May 17, 2018 –  April 3, 2020
Thomas Monheim, (Acting IG) April 3, 2020 - October 4, 2021
Thomas Monheim, October 4, 2021 - Present

References 

United States intelligence agencies
Government agencies established in 2010
Intelligence Community